Rakhtbeej is a Bollywood political thriller movie directed by Anil Ballani, released in 2012.

Cast 
The cast includes

Mansi Dovhal
Rajesh Khattar
Tinu Anand
Sayantani Nandi
K. Jeeva
Yatin Karyekar
Sanjay R Gagnani
Julia Dutt
Amanjot
Master Divyaansh
Jay Shanker Pandey as Chabeela
Rakhi Sawant as item number

Plot 
The movie is based on the two men Abhay and Ajay (both played by Maanas) whose fate take them to powerful positions in business and politics. Due to a love triangle and their enmity with other powerful politicians and business men their life goes for a toss.

Soundtrack 
Soundtrack was composed by Satish-Ajay.

Critical reception 
The movie got negative feedback for both its music and content.

References

External links 
 

2012 films
2010s Hindi-language films
2010s political thriller films

Indian political thriller films